The Bulandra Theatre in Bucharest, Romania was founded in 1947 as Teatrul Municipal; its first director was Lucia Sturdza-Bulandra, one of the leading Romanian stage actresses of her generation. Liviu Ciulei was director between 1963 and 1972; one of the most important directors since then was Ștefan Iordănescu (1999–2002), who restructured the theatre management. From 2002 until his death in 2019, the theatre was directed by Alexandru Darie; as of 2020, the director is Vlad Zamfirescu.

Since 1991, the Bulandra Theatre has been a member of the Union of European Theatres, which was founded in March 1990.

Originally Teatrul Municipal, the theatre later acquired the name Teatrul Lucia Sturdza Bulandra, now shortened to Teatrul Bulandra. The present Sala Liviu Ciulei (Izvor) was and remains the headquarters, housing offices as well as the actual theatre space. The main teatre building has been renamed in 2011 after the previous head of Bulandra Theatre, film and theatre director and actor Liviu Ciulei. Before Communist times, the second hall, located by Grădina Icoanei and designed by architect Ion Mincu, was the auditorium of a private school, Școala Centrală de Fete (Central Girls' School), located on Icoanei Street. After nationalization, the hall was first renamed after Filimon Sârbu, then later took its present name, in memory of actor Toma Caragiu.

References

External links

 Official site; the pages about both past productions and those in their current repertory contain numerous photos, over 100 in all.

Bulandra Theatre
Bulandra Theatre
1947 establishments in Romania